List of near-Earth object observation projects is a list of projects that observe Near-Earth objects. Most are astronomical surveys intended to find undiscovered asteroids. They sometimes find comets.

See also
List of asteroid close approaches to Earth
Asteroid impact prediction
:Category:Asteroid surveys
Space debris
Astronomical survey
Timeline of astronomical maps, catalogs, and surveys
List of asteroid-discovering observatories

References

External links
The Catalina Sky Survey: Exploration leads to discovery
overview graph of asteroid discovery since 1800
List of asteroid surveys

Near-Earth object tracking